The 2019–20 Richmond Spiders women's basketball team represents the University of Richmond during the 2019–20 NCAA Division I women's basketball season. The Spiders, led by first year head coach Aaron Roussell, play their home games at the Robins Center and are members of the Atlantic 10 Conference.

Roussell was announced as Richmond's head coach on April 2, 2019, after having  spent seven seasons as head coach at Bucknell University. Roussell succeeded Michael Shafer, who had spent 14 years as the head coach of the Spiders.

Previous season
The Spiders finished the 2018–19 season with a record of 9–21, 6–10 in A-10 play to finish in eleventh place. They lost in the first round of the A-10 women's tournament to No. 6 seed Saint Louis.

Roster

Schedule
Richmond's 2019–20 non-conference schedule consists of 14 games, including two tournaments: two games in the Coastal Carolina Thanksgiving Tournament in Conway, South Carolina, and three games in the Anne Donovan Classic in Norfolk, Virginia.

In the Atlantic 10 portion of the schedule, Richmond plays a total of 16 games, including home and away games against VCU, La Salle, and St. Bonaventure. In addition, Richmond hosts Davidson, Dayton, Duquesne, Fordham and Saint Louis, while the Spiders travel to George Mason, George Washington, Massachusetts, Rhode Island, and Saint Joseph's.

The first round of the 2020 Atlantic 10 Women's Basketball Tournament will be played at campus sites on March 3, 2020, with the top two seeds receiving byes into the second round. The quarterfinals, semifinals, and finals will be played March 6–8, 2020, at UD Arena in Dayton, Ohio.

|-
!colspan=9 style=| Non-conference regular season

|-
!colspan=9 style=| Atlantic 10 regular season

|-
!colspan=9 style=| Atlantic 10 tournament

Source:

References

Richmond Spiders women's basketball seasons
Richmond
Richmond Spiders women's basketball